The Mahadek Formation is a Mesozoic geologic formation in India. Dinosaur remains are among the fossils that have been recovered from the formation, although none have yet been referred to a specific genus.

See also

 List of dinosaur-bearing rock formations
 List of stratigraphic units with indeterminate dinosaur fossils

Footnotes

References
 Weishampel, David B.; Dodson, Peter; and Osmólska, Halszka (eds.): The Dinosauria, 2nd, Berkeley: University of California Press. 861 pp. .

Geologic formations of India
Maastrichtian Stage